Still 02:00pm is the first extended play by South Korean boy band, 2PM. The album was released in digital and physical format by October 11, 2010. The album reached number 1 and the first single "I'll Be Back" number 4 in the Gaon Chart. Besides "I'll Be Back", all the other tracks on "Still 02:00PM" also charted on the Gaon Chart.

On November 1, 2010, Still 02:00PM debuted unexpectedly on the 13th spot of the Billboard's World Album-Chart though no specific promotions for the album were made in the US. The songs "I'll Be Back" and "I Can't" were later added on the group's second album, Hands Up.

Track listing

Charts

Sales and certifications

References

External links 
 Official Website

Dance-pop EPs
2PM EPs
JYP Entertainment EPs
Kakao M EPs
Korean-language EPs
2010 EPs